John Higford (c. 1551 – 1612) was the member of Parliament for Cricklade in the parliaments of 1572 and 1586.

References 

Members of the Parliament of England (pre-1707) for Cricklade
1550s births
1612 deaths
Year of birth uncertain
English MPs 1572–1583
English MPs 1586–1587